Osredak is a village in the municipality of Krupa na Uni, Bosnia and Herzegovina.

Demographics 
According to the 2013 census, its population was 145, all Serbs.

References

Populated places in Krupa na Uni
Villages in Republika Srpska